Matthieu Lecuyer (born 19 August 1980) is a professional French sports car racer from Bordeaux, France. He has raced as a member of Team Oreca, Peugeot Sport, CD Sport Performance Engineering, Team Speedcars, Team Iconic Parts, and Backdraft Racing. He has driven Peugeot spider THP, Nissan BRS 4.0 BIORACING, Radical SR8LM, Audi R8 LMS ULTRA GT3, Ferrari 458 GT3, Lamborghini LP 570 ST and Huracan GT3, BMW Z4 GTC, Porsche RSR, LMP2 and LMP3 prototype, ORECA FLM, Ginetta G55, Mustang GT3, WV Sirocco TCR, BMW MGT3, BDR GT3. He was part of the World Endurance Championship WEC with the famous and multiple winner team Oreca in the 24 hours of Le Mans.

Career

Lecuyer began his motor sports career by racing go kart in his early ages. First auto racing season was in the Legends Car Cup France from 2007-2008. His 2008 season included 2 pole positions and 3 victories. In 2009, Lecuyer participated in the Peugeot THP Spider Cup. He also participated in SCCA GT1 USA that year. Lecuyer raced in the Bioracing Series during the 2010 season and finished in third place in the championship.

He participated in both the VDEV Endurance Series and Radical European Masters in 2011 driving Norma and Radical Prototype. Lecuyer also competed in the 2012 and 2013 seasons of the Michelin European VDEV Endurance Series still with Norma Prototype. He competed in the 2013 European Le Mans Series as a member of team ORECA. He drove the Oreca 09 and finished third at both Silverstone and Imola. He additionally raced in Pirelli World Challenge and NASA Pro Racing in 2013 for the Team Iconic in a Mustang GT3. Lecuyer competed in the 24 Hours of Le Mans in June 2013. He raced for BMW MOTORSPORT and Team DKR Engineering during the final race of the European Le Mans series with a Z4 GT3 and finished 5TH in GTC category.

He has been the official driver of the American manufacturer Backdraft Racing since 2012 and under contract until 2019. In 2014, Lecuyer participated in the French Gt Championship with the Team Speecars and an AUDI R8 ULTRA LMS. Lecuyer also compete in NASA Pro Racing, and FARA Racing USA. He competed in FARA at Homestead-Miami Speedway in February 2014, but hit by a Corvette GT1 and knocked out of the race. A month later, Lecuyer finished in second place at the Continental Finance Challenge. He also recorded the fastest lap during the challenge head of former Formula One driver Olivier Panis and Franck Lagorce

In April 2014, Lecuyer finished in third place during his first race in the French GT Tour in Le Mans for Team Speed Car. He raced in an Audi R8 LMS Ultra.
in October 2014 he raced a one shot for the English Manufacture Ginetta during the race of champions in Miami and finished 4th overhall after being the leader for 2 hours . A brake failure stopped him for a long time in the pits.

For the 2015 Season Matthieu Lecuyer is recruited by Ginetta USA to compete in the FARA USA championship . In this PRO-AM championship he will be team mate with the Bresilian gentleman driver Kreis Rulino. After 4 races and 3 podiums in the Spring challenge, Sunset 300 and Sebring 500 Lecuyer quit Ginetta at the end of season to sign with LAMBORGHINI MIAMI by Avid Motorsports in the NORTH AMERICA SUPER TROFEO. In his first race in Texas at the circuit of the Americas he finished second for his first PRO CUP race with the Italian manufacture. one month later he will end 7th in Road Atlanta during the PETIT le Mansrace.In November 2015 he wins the second race of the WORLD FINAL in Sebring, he also scored the best lap time during the race. In 2016 he extended his contract as a Lamborghini Miami driver with the LAMBORGHINI LP 570 ST-4 in its last years and the new LAMBORGHINI HURACAN ST 620-2

Notable results

Notable results for 2013–2014:

Personal life
Lecuyer is a former airline pilot and  lives in Las Vegas, Nevada, USA. He is also known for his personal classic car collection.

References

French racing drivers
1980 births
Living people
24H Series drivers
Oreca drivers
European Le Mans Series drivers